Pacific Explorer (previously known as Dawn Princess) is a cruise ship operated since June 2017 by P&O Cruises Australia, a cruise line brand owned by the Carnival Corporation & plc. It is a  built by Fincantieri, Italy, in 1997, and features eight restaurants, four swimming pools, five hot tubs/spas/whirlpools, seven lounges and bars, and two children centres.

Pacific Explorer and Sun Princess differ from Oceana and Sea Princess by having exterior bridge wings. Oceana and Sea Princess have internal bridge wings.

Princess Cruises

Ports of call 

Dawn Princess began sailing in Australia as of 24 September 2008 with a 28-day itinerary circumnavigating the country, after a month serving Hawaii, Tahiti, and the South Pacific. From this point on, Dawn Princess remained in Australia permanently sailing from Sydney, Melbourne and Perth alongside Sun Princess under the Princess brand until it was transferred to P&O Cruises Australia and renamed Pacific Explorer.

Refurbishment 
In June 2009, Dawn Princess was dry-docked in the Port of Brisbane, Australia, for refurbishment.

In June 2017 Pacific Explorer was dry-docked in Sembawang Singapore, for refurbishment and re-branding from Dawn Princess.
February 2020 Pacific Explorer Dry Dock for February 12 to February 27 for refurbishments and maintenance

P&O Cruises Australia
On 7 October 2015, Carnival announced that Dawn Princess would be transferred in May 2017 to its Australian subsidiary P&O Cruises Australia as Pacific Explorer. Dawn Princess entered drydock on 26 May 2017 in Singapore (Sembawang) for conversion to Pacific Explorer to be released for cruises on 22 June.

It was re-registered to the United Kingdom and arrived in Sydney, New South Wales on 19 June for a 3-day stay before conducting its maiden voyage to the Pacific Islands. She was christened by the Nickelodeon Studios character Dora the Explorer on 2 July 2017 at Sydney Overseas Passenger Terminal after arriving from its maiden voyage.

On 2June 2022 the Pacific Explorer was the first cruise ship to use the new Brisbane International Cruise Terminal.

Accidents and incidents
On 13 December 2022, a woman fell overboard between Melbourne and Kangaroo Island, triggering a search off the coast of South Australia. Her body was found several hours later, and a joint investigation by South Australia Police and Victoria Police was initiated.

References

External links
 
 Official website

Ships of P&O Cruises Australia
Ships of Princess Cruises
Ships built in Monfalcone
Ships built by Fincantieri
1996 ships